Rabat Tepe is an Iron Age archaeological site located about 5 km east of Sardasht in northwestern Iran.

References

Archaeological sites in Iran